Marie Kubiak  (born 11 May 1981 in Valenciennes) is a French women's international footballer who plays as a forward. She is a member of the France women's national football team. She was part of the team at the UEFA Women's Euro 2001. On club level she plays for Olympique Lyonnais in France.

References

External links
 
 

1981 births
Living people
Sportspeople from Valenciennes
French women's footballers
France women's international footballers
Place of birth missing (living people)
Women's association football forwards
Footballers from Hauts-de-France
Olympique Lyonnais Féminin players
Montpellier HSC (women) players